Vivien Brisse (born 8 April 1988) is a track cyclist from France who also competed on the road. In 2011 he won the bronze medal in the madison at the 2011 UEC European Track Championships, together with Morgan Kneisky, in Apeldoorn, the Netherlands. Two years later they became world champion in the Men's madison at the 2013 UCI Track Cycling World Championships. Brisse competed at all UCI Track Cycling World Championships between 2010 and 2014.

References

1988 births
French male cyclists
Living people
Place of birth missing (living people)
French track cyclists